Ahmaad is a given name. Notable people with the name include:

 Ahmaad Galloway (1980–2023), American football player
 Ahmaad Rorie (born 1996), American basketball player
 Ahmaad Smith (born 1983), American football player

See also
 Ahmad